Pavlo Olehovych Ishchenko (Павел Олегович Ищенко; nicknamed "Wild Man"; born April 30, 1992) is an Olympic Ukrainian-Israeli boxer who competes as a bantamweight. He won the gold medal at the 2013 European Amateur Boxing Championships as a  Lightweight (60 kg) for Ukraine. In 2017, boxing for Israel, he won a bronze medal at the 2017 European Amateur Boxing Championships as a Lightweight.

Early and personal life
Ishchenko was born in Petropavlovsk-Kamchatsky, Kamchatka Krai, Russia, and is Jewish. His father, Oleg Ishchenko, is also Jewish and is his coach. He grew up in Kherson, in southern Ukraine, where he attended the local Chabad.

Boxing career
He represented Ukraine at the 2012 Summer Olympics, at 20 years of age, and was defeated in Round One of the Men's bantamweight by Joseph Diaz of the United States, 9–19, and came in 17th.

He won the gold medal at the 2013 European Amateur Boxing Championships as a Lightweight (60 kg) for Ukraine, receiving congratulations from Prime Minister Mykola Azarov. He also won a bronze medal at the Baku 2015 European Games, as he pulled out injured from his semi-final bout.  He competed for Ukraine until 2015.

As an amateur he had a record of 294–23.

In February 2016, he defeated Rafael Vazquez of Puerto Rico in a unanimous six-round decision in New York City, to bring his professional record to 3–0 (2 KOs).

In 2017, he won the Israeli National Championship in the lightweight division. That same year, boxing for Israel, he won a bronze medal at the 2017 European Amateur Boxing Championships as a Lightweight.

References

External links
 
 

1992 births
Sportspeople from Kherson
Living people
Jewish boxers
Jewish Israeli sportspeople
Olympic boxers of Ukraine
Boxers at the 2012 Summer Olympics
Jewish Ukrainian sportspeople
Bantamweight boxers
Lightweight boxers
Israeli male boxers
Ukrainian male boxers
Ukrainian Jews
Naturalized citizens of Israel
Ukrainian emigrants to Israel